Ramesh Upreti or Ramesh Uprety (born December 3rd, 1973) is a Nepalese actor known for his work in Nepali cinema. He made his debut through film Karodpati in 1997. He was one of the busiest actors of the late 1990s to the early 2000s. He eventually relocated to the United States, took a significant break from his acting career; he made his come back to the industry with Bracelet (2016) and Aishwarya (2017).

Filmography

References

External links 

 

Living people
21st-century Nepalese male actors
Nepalese male film actors
Khas people
1973 births